Levi Adams (December 30, 1762June 18, 1831) was an American farmer and politician.  He served in the New York Senate from 1818 through 1822, representing Lewis County, and was a member of New York's Council of Appointment in 1820.  As a young man during the American Revolutionary War, he served in the New York militia.

His youngest son, James M. Adams, became a prominent physician and pioneer settler at Fond du Lac, Wisconsin.  Two of his grandsons died in the service of the Union Army during the American Civil War.

References

1762 births
1831 deaths
People of the Province of New York
New York (state) state senators
Burials in New York (state)